Matthieu Pavon (born 2 November 1992) is a French professional golfer who plays on the European Tour.

Personal life 
His father is former French professional footballer Michel Pavon.

Professional career
After turning professional Pavon played on the Alps Tour in 2014 and 2015. He won the Open International de Rebetz in 2014 and the Servizitalia Open in 2015. He reached the final stage of the 2015 European Tour Q School and gained a place on the Challenge Tour for 2016.

Pavon didn't win on the 2016 Challenge Tour but he finished in second place three times: at the Turkish Airlines Challenge, Montecchia Golf Open and Foshan Open. He was joint third in the NBO Golf Classic Grand Final and finished sixth on the Road To Oman Rankings to earn his 2017 European Tour card.

Pavon's first season on the European Tour was moderately successful and he finished 49th in the Order of Merit. His best result was to finish second in the 2018 AfrAsia Bank Mauritius Open at Anahita after a final round 67. He finished as well third in the 2017 Scottish Open. The tournament was one of the Open Qualifying Series events and his high finish gave him an entry to the 2017 Open Championship the following week. He had rounds of 74 and 78 and missed the cut.

Pavon had less success on the 2018 European Tour, finishing the season 89th in the Order of Merit. He finished tied for 5th in the AfrAsia Bank Mauritius Open at the end of 2017 but his only other top-10 finish was in the Dubai Duty Free Irish Open. He qualified for his first U.S. Open. He started with a 71 and made the cut, despite a second round 77, finishing in a tie for 25th place.

Professional wins (3)

Alps Tour wins (2)

French Tour wins (1)

Results in major championships

CUT = missed the half-way cut
"T" = tied

See also
2016 Challenge Tour graduates

References

External links

French male golfers
European Tour golfers
Sportspeople from Toulouse
Sportspeople from Gironde 
1992 births
Living people